The Screaming Woman is a 1972 American made-for-television horror-thriller film starring Olivia de Havilland and directed by Jack Smight. It is loosely based on a short story by Ray Bradbury (which in turn was based on his 1948 radio play for the CBS show Suspense) with a script written by Merwin Gerard. The film was produced by Universal Television and originally aired as an ABC Movie of the Week on January 29, 1972. It features John Williams's last score (to date) for a TV movie.

Plot
De Havilland plays Laura Wynant, a wealthy former mental patient who has travelled to her country estate to recuperate. While there, she discovers, when hearing faint calls for help, that a woman has been buried alive on her property. Laura tries to inform others of what she has found but nobody believes her, and her family begins to suspect a relapse in her mental condition. Because her hands are nearly crippled by arthritis, she is not able to dig the woman up herself. She tricks a local boy into assisting her by telling him she is digging for a lost earring, but when he is scared by the cries of the buried woman she is forced to tell him the truth, which results in a confrontation with the lad's angry father. While going door-to-door to seek help she encounters the buried woman's husband, who had buried her after striking her on the head with a shovel and thought her dead. Laura is confined to her home under doctor's orders but, in a fit of desperation, experiences enough recovery from the arthritis to provide strength in her hands. She begins to dig up the buried woman, who is still alive. Just then the murderous husband arrives on the scene, intending to bury his wife's body thoroughly. He comes up behind Laura and is about to strike her with the shovel when the buried woman grabs Laura's hand and pulls herself up out of the ground. The husband is petrified, giving the authorities just enough time to arrive on the scene and save Laura and the buried woman.

Cast
 Olivia de Havilland as Laura Wynant
 Ed Nelson as Carl Nesbitt
 Laraine Stephens as Caroline Wynant
 Joseph Cotten as George Tresvant
 Walter Pidgeon as Dr. Amos Larkin
 Charles Knox Robinson as Howard Wynant
 Alexandra Hay as Evie Carson
 Lonny Chapman as Police Sergeant
 Charles Drake as Ken Bronson
 Russell Wiggins as Harry Sands
 Gene Andrusco as David
 Joyce Cunningham as Bernice Wilson
 Jan Arvan as Martin, the Servant
 Ray Montgomery as Ted Wilson
 John Alderman as Slater

Television debuts
The film was first shown in the United States on January 29, 1972, in Sweden on June 23, 1973, and in Great Britain in July 1985.

Other adaptations
A television adaptation more faithful to the source material was broadcast as "The Screaming Woman", episode 5 of season 1 of The Ray Bradbury Theater, on February 22, 1986.

References
1972 NBC show.

External links

 

1972 television films
1972 films
1970s horror thriller films
1972 horror films
ABC Movie of the Week
American horror thriller films
American horror television films
Films directed by Jack Smight
Films scored by John Williams
Films based on short fiction
Films based on works by Ray Bradbury
1970s American films